Michnik is a Polish-language surname. Notable people with this surname include:

Adam Michnik, Polish former dissident, historian, journalist, and politician
Stefan Michnik, military judge in Communist Poland
, Polish music conductor, professor, director of Krakow Opera and Wroclaw Opera

Polish-language surnames